Raging Bull is a steel roller coaster located at Six Flags Great America in Gurnee, Illinois. Designed by Werner Stengel and manufactured by Bolliger & Mabillard (B&M), the ride opened to the public on May 1, 1999. It was the second B&M Hyper Coaster model to open in the United States, closely following the opening of Apollo's Chariot at Busch Gardens Williamsburg.

History
On October 21, 1998, Six Flags Great America announced that they would be adding Raging Bull for the 1999 season. It would be located in the Southwest Territory section next to Viper. The park hired Bolliger & Mabillard to build a brand new hyper coaster. Construction on Raging Bull began in November 1998 and was completed by the following spring. It opened to the public on May 1, 1999. A media day was held two days earlier on April 29.

In 2008, Raging Bull was repainted. The following year, the ride received a new entrance sign depicting a more aggressive bull.

On June 15, 2016, Six Flags announced that Virtual Reality (VR) would be added to the ride later in the year. The VR experience didn't last long on the rides that offered it across the Six Flags chain due to slower load times and longer lines, as well as additional staffing to distribute and sanitize each headset.

Description
Raging Bull is located in the Southwest Territory section of Six Flags Great America, situated between Viper and the giant helix on American Eagle. It was built on the site previously occupied by Rolling Thunder, a bobsled roller coaster that operated at the park from 1989 to 1995. Raging Bull's station is designed to have a run-down appearance. The track is painted orange with unpainted rails and wine-colored supports.

Ride experience
As the train exits the station, it makes a left turn and a small dip before ascending the lift hill. The track then ascends into a hammerhead turn to the right. After the turnaround is a parabolic hill with a trim brake on the uphill side. This is followed by another hill that banks left over the station area, a dip under the lift hill, and another hammerhead turn to the left. The train then makes a right-hand uphill turn into a mid-course brake run. Dropping off the mid-course brakes, the track passes the on-ride camera. This is followed by an airtime hill and a three-quarter turn to the right, wrapping around the first drop and diving into a figure-eight turn. Exiting the turn, the train rises uphill and enters the final brake run before returning to the station.

Awards

References

External links

 Six Flags Great America: Raging Bull

Roller coasters introduced in 1999
Roller coasters in Illinois
Roller coasters operated by Six Flags
Six Flags Great America
1999 establishments in Illinois
Hypercoasters manufactured by Bolliger & Mabillard